London Mozart Players (LMP) are a British chamber orchestra founded in 1949. LMP are the longest-established chamber orchestra in the United Kingdom. Since 1989, the orchestra has been Resident Orchestra at Fairfield Halls, Croydon.

History

Beginnings
The orchestra was formed in 1949 by violinist Harry Blech. Having just branched out into conducting, he was approached by pianist Dorothea Braus to arrange and conduct an all-Mozart concert at Wigmore Hall. Blech continued to arrange and perform increasingly successful concerts with the London Mozart Players, which lead to regular broadcasts by the BBC. The orchestra performed in the opening week's events at the Royal Festival Hall in 1951and became regulars there and later at the Queen Elizabeth Hall.

Later history and present day
Musicians associated with the Players include James Galway, Felicity Lott, Jane Glover, Howard Shelley, John Suchet and Simon Callow. Nicola Benedetti, Jacqueline du Pré and Jan Pascal Tortelier played early in their careers with the orchestra. At present, it welcomes soloists such as Sheku Kanneh-Mason, Jess Gillam and Anna Lapwood. Leia Zhu is the current Young Artist-in-Residence. It tours Europe and the Far East, and records for Naxos, Chandos and Hyperion Records.

In London, the orchestra performs in venues including the Royal Festival Hall, St Martin-in-the-Fields, St John's Smith Square and Cadogan Hall, as well as in cathedrals and other concert venues across the UK. LMP are the resident orchestra at Croydon's Fairfield Halls. In 2016, it temporarily relocated its offices to St John the Evangelist, Upper Norwood. It is managed both operationally and artistically by the players. The orchestra has enjoyed the patronage of the Duke of Edinburgh since 1988.

Principal conductors
1949–1984 Harry Blech
1984–1992 Jane Glover
1992–2000 Matthias Bamert
2000–2006 Andrew Parrott
2010–2014 Gérard Korsten
2015–present Howard Shelley (Conductor Laureate)
2022–present Jonathan Bloxham (Conductor in Residence and Artistic Advisor)

Contemporaries of Mozart series
In 1993, the London Mozart Players began a series of recordings for Chandos Records of works by lesser-known eighteenth-century composers, entitled the Contemporaries of Mozart series. Many of these recordings have drawn widespread critical acclaim and have been credited with bringing these lesser-heard composers to the public light. A number of releases have also been awarded Editor's Choice in Gramophone magazine. The series includes works by:

Carlos Baguer
Christian Cannabich
Muzio Clementi
François-Joseph Gossec
Adalbert Gyrowetz
Michael Haydn
William Herschel
Franz Anton Hoffmeister
Leopold Kozeluch
Franz Krommer
John Marsh
Leopold Mozart
Josef Mysliveček
Václav Pichl
Ignace Joseph Pleyel
Franz Xaver Richter
Antonio Rosetti
Antonio Salieri
Carl Stamitz
Georg Joseph Vogler

Johann Baptist Wanhal
Samuel Wesley
Paul Wranitzky

References

External links
London Mozart Players official website
London Mozart Players 2018/19 
 St John the Evangelist, Upper Norwood 
Fairfield Halls, Croydon website
Chandos Records website

London orchestras
Musical groups established in 1949
Chamber orchestras
Mozart music ensembles
1949 establishments in the United Kingdom
Juno Award for Classical Album of the Year – Large Ensemble or Soloist(s) with Large Ensemble Accompaniment winners